The city and comune of Genoa, capital of the region of Liguria, northwestern Italy, has twenty six railway stations and stops in use today.

The majority of these stations is managed by RFI. Four remaining stations, Genova Piazza Manin and others, are operated by AMT.

The only station in Genoa that has been completely closed without being replaced is Sant'Ilario, in the Genoa district of that name.

Chronological list of stations

See also

History of rail transport in Italy
List of railway stations in Liguria
Rail transport in Italy
Railway stations in Italy

References

 
Gen